In mathematics, the category Grp (or Gp) has the class of all groups for objects and group homomorphisms for morphisms. As such, it is a concrete category. The study of this category is known as group theory.

Relation to other categories
There are two forgetful functors from Grp,  M: Grp → Mon from groups to monoids and U: Grp → Set from groups to sets. M has two adjoints: one right, I: Mon→Grp, and one left, K: Mon→Grp. I: Mon→Grp is the functor sending every monoid to the submonoid of invertible elements and K: Mon→Grp the functor sending every monoid to the Grothendieck group of that monoid. The forgetful functor U: Grp → Set has a left adjoint given by the composite KF: Set→Mon→Grp, where F is the free functor; this functor assigns to every set S the free group on S.

Categorical properties
The monomorphisms in Grp are precisely the injective homomorphisms, the epimorphisms are precisely the surjective homomorphisms, and the isomorphisms are precisely the bijective homomorphisms.

The category Grp is both complete and co-complete. The category-theoretical product in Grp is just the direct product of groups while the category-theoretical coproduct in Grp is the free product of groups. The zero objects in Grp are the trivial groups (consisting of just an identity element).

Every morphism f : G → H in Grp has a category-theoretic kernel (given by the ordinary kernel of algebra ker f = {x in G | f(x) = e}), and also a category-theoretic cokernel (given by the factor group of H by the normal closure of f(G) in H). Unlike in abelian categories, it is not true that every monomorphism in Grp is the kernel of its cokernel.

Not additive and therefore not abelian
The category of abelian groups, Ab, is a full subcategory of Grp. Ab is an abelian category, but Grp is not. Indeed, Grp isn't even an additive category, because there is no natural way to define the "sum" of two group homomorphisms. A proof of this is as follows: The set of morphisms from the symmetric group S3 of order three to itself, has ten elements: an element z whose product on either side with every element of E is z (the homomorphism sending every element to the identity), three elements such that their product on one fixed side is always itself (the projections onto the three subgroups of order two), and six automorphisms.  If Grp were an additive category, then this set E of ten elements would be a ring.  In any ring, the zero element is singled out by the property that 0x=x0=0 for all x in the ring, and so z would have to be the zero of E.  However, there are no two nonzero elements of E whose product is z, so this finite ring would have no zero divisors.  A finite ring with no zero divisors is a field by Wedderburn's little theorem, but there is no field with ten elements because every finite field has for its order, the power of a prime.

Exact sequences
The notion of exact sequence is meaningful in Grp, and some results from the theory of abelian categories, such as the nine lemma, the five lemma, and their consequences hold true in Grp. 

Grp is a regular category.

References

 

Groups
Group theory